Bathsheba A. Benedict (1809–1897) was a Baptist philanthropist from Pawtucket, Rhode Island who was a co-founder, benefactor, and namesake of Benedict College, an historically black college, in South Carolina.

Bathsheba Adams Barber (Benedict) was born in Bellingham, Massachusetts in 1809. In 1830 she married Stephen Benedict, a banker, mill owner, Baptist church deacon, and early abolitionist from Pawtucket. Her husband died in a fire in 1868. Using proceeds from her husband's insurance policy and estate and with a donation from her brother-in-law, Bathsheba Benedict coordinated a donation of several thousand dollars to the American Baptist Home Mission Society to start a Baptist school for freed slaves in the South. By 1870 Benedict represented the Home Mission Society, and provided the $13,000.00 to purchase a former plantation property in Columbia, South Carolina to use for the school campus, which was named in her honor. Benedict died in 1897 and was buried in the Swan Point Cemetery in Providence, Rhode Island.

References

1809 births
1897 deaths
Philanthropists from Massachusetts
Benedict College
University and college founders
People from Bellingham, Massachusetts
People from Pawtucket, Rhode Island
American Civil War industrialists
19th-century Baptists
Baptists_from_Massachusetts
Burials at Swan Point Cemetery
19th-century American philanthropists
American abolitionists